Kevin Foster may refer to:

Kevin Foster (baseball) (1969–2008), Major League Baseball pitcher
Kevin Foster (basketball), American basketball player
Kevin Foster (fraudster), British investment fraudster
Kevin Foster (murderer) (born 1977), American murderer
Kevin Foster (Hollyoaks), fictional character
Kevin Foster (cyclist) (born 1960), American actor and adventurer
Kevin Foster (politician), British Conservative Member of Parliament (MP) for Torbay since 2015
Kevin Foster (ice hockey), American ice hockey player